Robiquetia succisa is a species of orchid occurring from the eastern Himalaya to southern China and Indochina.

References

succisa
Orchids of Asia
Plants described in 1826